Mihovica is a settlement on the right bank of the Krka River in the Municipality of Šentjernej in southeastern Slovenia. Traditional 19th-century farmhouses and outbuildings are preserved in the village core and it has been included on the Slovenian Ministry of Culture's register of national heritage. The area is part of the traditional region of Lower Carniola. It is now included in the Southeast Slovenia Statistical Region.

References

External links

Mihovica on Geopedia

Populated places in the Municipality of Šentjernej